William Alexander Sutton  (1 March 1917 – 23 January 2000) was a New Zealand portrait and landscape artist. A graduate of the Canterbury College School of Art (now the University of Canterbury School of Fine Arts) he returned there to teach for more than 30 years.

He was tutored by many well-known Canterbury artists, including Colin Lovell-Smith, Evelyn Page and Archibald Nicoll and gained his Diploma of Fine Arts in 1937. In 1947 he travelled to London where he studied for a time at the Anglo-French centre in St John's Wood. On returning to New Zealand in 1949 he took up a teaching position at Canterbury University College School of Art and was appointed senior lecturer in 1959. During the 1940s and 1950s Sutton followed in the tradition of fellow Canterbury artists, such as Rita Angus, Colin and Rata Lovell-Smith and Louise Henderson, developing a distinctive interpretation of the Canterbury landscape. Sutton continued to teach at the school until his retirement in 1979. Sutton continued to paint until 1993.

In the 1980 Queen's Birthday Honours, Sutton was appointed a Commander of the Order of the British Empire, for services to art.

Sutton's paintings are typically signed / credited as WA Sutton. Much of his work shows the influence of New Zealand regionalism as with fellow Cantabrian Rita Angus. In 1963, Sutton built a house in Templar Street in the Christchurch suburb of Richmond. Until his retirement in 1992, he painted most of his works there. The house was bought by a former curator of the Robert McDougall Art Gallery and it was his intention to gift it as a home for an artist in residence scheme. Following the 2011 Christchurch earthquake, the house is located in the Residential Red Zone and was thus purchased by the Canterbury Earthquake Recovery Authority; it is hoped for the house to be kept despite the red zoning.
A retrospective of his work was held at Christchurch Art Gallery Te Puna o Waiwhetū in 2003.

In March 2009, Sutton was commemorated as one of the Twelve Local Heroes, and a bronze bust of him was unveiled outside the Christchurch Arts Centre.

(Untitled) Taylors Mistake 
One of his most popular paintings is of the baches at Taylors Mistake near Christchurch with the brown hills in the background. This painting is held by the Christchurch Art Gallery.

Notable people painted
 John Cawte Beaglehole.
 Alice Candy

References

People from Christchurch
Ilam School of Fine Arts alumni
Academic staff of the University of Canterbury
1917 births
2000 deaths
20th-century New Zealand painters
20th-century New Zealand male artists
New Zealand Commanders of the Order of the British Empire